|}

The Sovereign Stakes is a Group 3 flat horse race in Great Britain open to colts and geldings aged three years or older. It is run at Salisbury over a distance of 1 mile (1,609 metres), and it is scheduled to take place each year in August.

The event was established in 2000, replacing the Whitchurch Conditions Stakes, and it was initially classed at Listed level. It was promoted to its current status, Group 3, in 2004.

The Sovereign Stakes is one of Salisbury's two highest class races of the season, along with the Dick Poole Fillies' Stakes.

Records
Most successful horse:
 no horse has won this race more than once

Leading jockey (2 wins):
 Dane O'Neill – Hopeful Light (2000), Umistim (2001)
 Jimmy Fortune – Side Glance (2011), Tullius (2012)
 Ryan Moore - Ordnance Row (2008), Ballet Concerto (2017)
 Oisin Murphy - Zonderland (2016), Kick On (2019)

Leading trainer (3 wins):
 Richard Hannon Sr. – Umistim (2001), Priors Lodge (2002), Ordnance Row (2008)
 Andrew Balding – Passing Glance (2003), Side Glance (2011), Tullius (2012)
 John Gosden - Hopeful Light (2000), Kick On (2019), Magellan (2021)

Winners

See also
 Horse racing in Great Britain
 List of British flat horse races

References
 Racing Post:
 , 

 galopp-sieger.de – Sovereign Stakes.
 ifhaonline.org – International Federation of Horseracing Authorities – Sovereign Stakes (2019).
 pedigreequery.com – Sovereign Stakes – Salisbury.

Flat races in Great Britain
Salisbury Racecourse
Open mile category horse races
Recurring sporting events established in 2000
2000 establishments in England